Cyrtandra crenata is a rare species of flowering plant in the African violet family known by the common name Kahana Valley cyrtandra. It is endemic to Oahu in Hawaii, where it is known only from the Koolau Mountains. It has not been seen since 1947, however, and it is feared extinct. The habitat is steep and inaccessible in some areas, so it is possible that specimens of this species still exist in the wild. It was federally listed an endangered species of the United States in 1994. This shrub grows 1 to 2 meters tall and bears white flowers. Like other Hawaiian Cyrtandra it is called ha`iwale.

References

External links

crenata
Endemic flora of Hawaii
Plants described in 1950